The following is a list of notable events and releases of the year 1903 in Norwegian music.

Events

 Edvard Grieg, in Paris, became the first Norwegian to make gramophone records.

Deaths

 July
 24 – Adolf Thomsen, organist and composer (born 1852).

 October
 27 – Erika Nissen pianist (born 1845).

Births

 April
 25 – Carl Gustav Sparre Olsen, violinist and composer (died 1984).
 28 – Egil Rasmussen, author, literature critic and pianist (died 1964).

 May
 2 – Øivin Fjeldstad, orchestra conductor, violinist, and conducted the Oslo Philharmonic (died 1983).

 August
 17 – Bjarne Amdahl, pianist, composer and orchestra conductor (died 1968).

 September
 29 – Karl Andersen, solo cellist for the Oslo Philharmonic (died 1970).

 October
 30 – Leif Rustad, cellist and radio pioneer (died 1976).

See also
 1903 in Norway
 Music of Norway

References

 
Norwegian music
Norwegian
Music
1900s in Norwegian music